Albrechtice may refer to places in the Czech Republic:

Albrechtice (Karviná District), a municipality and village in the Moravian-Silesian Region
Albrechtice (Ústí nad Orlicí District), a municipality and village in the Pardubice Region
Albrechtice, a village and part of Drahonice in the South Bohemian Region
Albrechtice, a village and part of Malešov in the Central Bohemian Region
Albrechtice, a village and part of Pěnčín (Liberec District) in the Liberec Region
Albrechtice, a village and part of Rozsochy in the Vysočina Region
Albrechtice, a village and part of Sušice in the Plzeň Region
Albrechtice nad Orlicí, a municipality and village in the Hradec Králové Region
Albrechtice nad Vltavou, a municipality and village in the South Bohemian Region
Albrechtice u Frýdlantu, a village and part of Frýdlant in the Liberec Region
Albrechtice u Rýmařova, a village and part of Rýmařov in the Moravian-Silesian Region
Albrechtice v Jizerských horách, a municipality and village in the Liberec Region
Město Albrechtice, a town in the Moravian-Silesian Region
Velké Albrechtice, a municipality and village in the Moravian-Silesian Region

See also
Albrechtičky, a municipality and village in Moravian-Silesian Region